Moving On is the fifth album by American vocalist, pianist and songwriter Oleta Adams, released in 1995. It saw Adams move towards a more straightforward R&B sound, working with established R&B producers Vassal Benford (who had produced Rebbie Jackson, Jade and Toni Braxton) and Michael J. Powell (producer of Randy Crawford, Anita Baker and Regina Belle) who helped to mix her usual soul, pop and gospel styles with R&B. Adams wrote or co-wrote six of the twelve songs on the album, and for the first time produced two of the songs.

Singles
Four singles were released from the album. The lead single, "Never Knew Love", was the most R&B-sounding song on the album, and gave Adams her fourth Top 40 hit in the UK. The second single, a re-recorded and remixed song from her first album, "Rhythm of Life" (only included in some editions of the album), gave Adams her last Top 40 hit in the UK to date. The final two singles from the album, the ballads "We Will Meet Again" and "Life Keeps Moving On", performed less well.

Commercial performance
The album had limited success, peaking at #59 in the UK Albums Chart and at #194 on the US Billboard 200, staying only one week on both charts. This was Adams' last charting album on both countries' main chart and the lack of commercial success led to Moving On being her last studio album released through Fontana Records.

The album was nominated for the Grammy Award for Best R&B Album at the 39th Grammy Awards.

Track listing

Note: Track 14 was originally released in 1991 on the album Two Rooms: Celebrating the Songs of Elton John & Bernie Taupin and was also released as a single, but up until the release of Moving On had never been included on an Adams album.

Charts

References

1995 albums
Oleta Adams albums
Fontana Records albums
Albums produced by Michael J. Powell